Mount Gunnison is a prominent mountain summit in the West Elk Mountains range of the Rocky Mountains of North America. The mountain is named in honor of John Williams Gunnison who explored the area.

Mountain

See also

List of Colorado mountain ranges
List of Colorado mountain summits
List of Colorado fourteeners
List of Colorado 4000 meter prominent summits
List of the most prominent summits of Colorado
List of Colorado county high points

References

External links

West Elk Mountains
Mountains of Gunnison County, Colorado
Mountains of Colorado
North American 3000 m summits